1999 saw many sequels and prequels in video games, such as Chrono Cross, Dance Dance Revolution 2ndMix, Dead or Alive 2, Street Fighter III: 3rd Strike, Donkey Kong 64, Final Fantasy VIII, Gran Turismo 2, Heroes of Might and Magic III, Mario Party, Pokémon Gold/Silver, Garou: Mark of the Wolves, Resident Evil 3, Soulcalibur, Soul Reaver, and Tomb Raider: The Last Revelation, along with new titles such as Ape Escape, Shenmue, Silent Hill, Tony Hawk's Pro Skater and Super Smash Bros. The Dreamcast was also released by Sega internationally in 1999.

The year's most critically acclaimed video game was the Dreamcast title Soulcalibur, which remains among the highest-rated games of all time on Metacritic. The best-selling home video game worldwide was the Game Boy title Pokémon Red/Green/Blue/Yellow for the second year in a row, while the year's highest-grossing arcade game in Japan was Sega's Virtua Striker 2.

Events
British Academy of Film and Television Arts hosts the 2nd annual BAFTA Interactive Entertainment Awards.
March – Game Over: How Nintendo Zapped an American Industry, Captured Your Dollars, and Enslaved Your Children is republished as Game Over: Press Start to Continue.
March 15 – Game Network hosts the 1st annual Independent Games Festival (IGF) at GDC.
March 15–19 – Game Developers Conference (formerly Computer Game Developers Conference); moves to San Jose, California where it stays for six consecutive years; hosts the 1st annual Independent Games Festival.
May 12 – Nintendo has started working on what will eventually be the GameCube, under the codename "Project Dolphin".
May 13 – Academy of Interactive Arts & Sciences hosts 2nd Annual Interactive Achievement Awards (at E3); inducts Sid Meier of Firaxis Games to the AIAS Hall of Fame.
May 13–15 – 5th annual Electronic Entertainment Expo (E3); the 2nd annual Game Critics Awards for the Best of E3.
Team Fortress 2 is announced for release during the year, but gets delayed until 2007.
September 7 - The SegaWorld London amusement park closes its doors for good after exactly three years of operation. The bottom two floors of the park continue to operate as a generic arcade until 2011.

Hardware
September 9 – Sega's Dreamcast is launched in North America with 19 launch titles.
Nintendo's Game Boy Light (GBL) handheld console released in Japan only
SNK's Neo Geo Pocket Color handheld released.
Tiger Electronics Game.com Pocket Pro handheld released.
Sony's PlayStation 2 is announced.

Top-rated games

Game of the Year awards 
The following titles won Game of the Year awards for 1999.

Critically acclaimed titles

Famitsu Platinum Hall of Fame 
The following video game releases in 1999 entered Famitsu magazine's "Platinum Hall of Fame" for receiving Famitsu scores of at least 35 out of 40.

Metacritic and GameRankings 
Metacritic (MC) and GameRankings (GR) are aggregators of video game journalism reviews.

Financial performance

Best-selling video game consoles

Best-selling home video games 
The following titles were the top ten best-selling home video games (console games or computer games) of 1999 in Japan, the United States, United Kingdom, and Germany.

The following titles were the top ten highest-grossing home video games of 1999 in the United States and Europe.

Japan
In Japan, the following titles were the top ten best-selling home video games of 1999.

United States
In the United States, the following titles were the top ten best-selling home video games of 1999.

Europe
In Europe, the following titles were the top ten highest-grossing home video games of 1999.

In the United Kingdom, Germany, and France, the following titles were the best-selling home video games of 1999.

Australia
In Australia, the following titles were the top ten best-selling console games of 1999.

Highest-grossing arcade games in Japan 
In Japan, the following titles were the top ten highest-grossing arcade games of 1999.

Notable releases

Business
February 22 – Sierra reorganizes to cut costs in what is widely referred to as the "Chainsaw Monday" Layoffs, closing several studios and their iconic former headquarters in Oakhurst, California. Some employees were given the option to relocate to their new headquarters in Bellevue, Washington.
Midway Games stops using the Atari Games brand.
New companies: 3d6 Games, 7 Studios, BAM!, Liquid Entertainment, Bohemia Interactive, 7FX

Acquisitions
Activision acquires Elsinore Multimedia, Expert Software, and Neversoft Entertainment
Infogrames Entertainment, SA acquires Accolade (Renamed Infogrames North America), Gremlin Interactive (renamed Infogrames Sheffield House), GT Interactive (GTIS), and Ozisoft
Take-Two Interactive acquires TalonSoft
ZeniMax Media acquires Bethesda Softworks
Codemasters acquires Sensible Software

Lawsuits
Nintendo v. Bung Enterprises Ltd.; Nintendo sues Bung over patent infringement
Sony Corporation v. Bleem LLC

See also
1999 in games

Notes

References

 
Video games by year